Zendtijd voor Politieke Partijen (English: Airtime for Political Parties) is the section on Dutch public television in which political parties get airtime to broadcast their political ads.

References
  Andere Tijden dossier about Zendtijd voor Politieke Partijen
  Zendtijd voor Politieke Partijen on the Beeld en Geluid wiki
  Propaganda ad of the Centrumdemocraten on Politieke Partijen (May 29, 1992)

Dutch public broadcasting organisations
Netherlands Public Broadcasting
Dutch-language television networks
Television channels and stations established in 1990